Alhassan Mohammed Gani is a Nigerian academic and administrator who is the former vice-chancellor of Federal University Kashere, in Gombe state.

Background
Gani was born in 1959 in Delgi, a local government area in Plateau state. He began his early education at the central school, Delgi from 1966 to 1973, He enrolled in a government secondary school, Pankshin, where he graduated with a certificate with distinction. In 1978 he obtained his B.Sc in Botany with an upper class from the University of Jos in years 1980 to 1984.

Gani went to the University of London where he obtained his M.Sc certificate in applied plant science in 1988. He then earned his Doctoral degree in Plant Physiology at Abubakar Tafawa Balewa University. He became a professor there in 2006.

References

 

1959 births
Living people
University of Jos alumni
Academic staff of Abubakar Tafawa Balewa University
Vice-Chancellors of Nigerian universities